Rinconada Bikol or simply Rinconada, spoken in the province of Camarines Sur, Philippines, is one of several languages that compose the Inland Bikol (or Southern Bicol) group of the Bikol macrolanguage. It belongs to the Austronesian language family that also includes most Philippine languages, the Formosan languages of Taiwanese aborigines, Malay (Indonesian and Bahasa Malaysia), the Polynesian languages and Malagasy.

Rinconada is surrounded by and shares common features with other Bikol languages. It is bordered by Coastal Bikol to the north, Buhinon to the east, and West Miraya language immediately to the south. The language's closest relatives outside the Bicol region are Aklanon, Waray-Waray, and to a lesser extent Tagalog, especially the variants used in Batangas and Marinduque.

Rinconada Bikol is the language adopted by the indigenous population of Agta/Aeta (the Negrito) in the surrounding mountainous areas of Mount Iriga (old name is Mount Asog). The Austronesian people that have migrated to the foot of Mount Asog from the lowland Nabua introduced the language to Negritos when they began conducting trade and commerce, thus replacing the native language of the latter. The original language of the Negritos is Inagta, also known to linguists as Mount Iriga Agta, an extinct or nearly extinct language. Inagta is said to have 86% intelligibility with Rinconada Bikol and a lexical similarity of 76%. Most Negritos, commonly called Agta or Aeta ( for camaraderie) today, are fluent in Rinconada Bikol, though speak a different variant.

Name 

The name Rinconada is derived from the Rinconada District in Camarines Sur where the language originated, developed and is largely spoken. However, the precise origins of how the term Rinconada was assigned to the area are still unclear. Popular wisdom ascribes the name to have come from the Spanish , 'cornered', from the root rincón, which means 'corner or small district'. Rinconada might have been given by the Spaniards to the then-newly explored and established colony in the southeastern corner of Luzon Island; natives formerly called the area Sumagang (Sumagaŋ), meaning 'far east'.

Adding credence to the theory of a Spanish origin are the localities of La Rinconada in Spain and La Rinconada in Chile, which was also a former Spanish colony.

Dialects 

The language is divided into two main dialects and subdivided into six variants:

Sinabukid (highland dialect) 
(Strong accent, flat intonation only, and with )
Agta variant
Iriga variant (de facto standard)

Sinaranəw (lakeside dialect) 
(Soft accent with different types of intonation, and without ) 
Nabua – Balatan variant
Baao variant
Bula – Pili variant
Bato variant

Dialectal variation

Features and geographic distribution 

 The Nabua-Balatan variant features high pitch intonation. It is the direct descendant of Rinconada Bikol but it has lost some features of the original spoken language. Speakers can be found throughout the municipalities of Nabua and Balatan.
 The Iriga variant, on the other hand, has the most speakers. The speakers are concentrated in the district's center, Iriga City, in some of the important barangays of Buhi (West and East Sta. Justina and De Los Angeles), and the urban barangay of Matacon, located in Polangui, Albay. The Iriga variant has a flat intonation and is spoken rapidly.
 The Bato variant, on the other hand, has a distinctive mellow intonation. It is said that regardless of one's mood, the Bato speaker always sounds sleepy, as if they are chanting. The Bato variant is primarily spoken in Bato, Camarines Sur and is also spoken in Agos, Polangui, Albay.
 The Agta variant is the smallest of the group. The speakers are exclusively the indigenous population of Agta/Aeta, the aboriginal people of different tribes surrounding Mount Iriga and Buhi lake. Like Iriga, the Agta variant also has a flat intonation; they speak the language with a distinct form of pronunciation which can be traced to the group's extinct language.
 The variants of Baao and Bula-Pili are considered twins. They have the same accent and only slight differences in vocabulary. Of the two variants, Baao often uses rising intonation, while Bula-Pili is moderately flat but both use high pitch when reasoning. The latter variant is used entirely in Bula and in the southern half of the provincial capital town of Pili. It also has a significant number of speakers in Ocampo and Minalabac in Camarines Sur. The two variants have borrowed some vocabulary from Coastal Bikol; at the same time, Bikol-Partido (a dialect of Coastal Bikol) can be heard with borrowed vocabulary from the two variants.

List of phrases and expressions that are unique to each variant:

 Baao variant: 
 Nabua – Balatan variant: 
 Agta variant: 
 Bato variant: 
 Bula – Pili variant: 
 Iriga variant:

Short imperatives 

Like other Visayan and Bikol languages, Rinconada Bikol has a short form for the imperative.

A special form is used when talking to elderly people in a polite manner. The letters "ā/a" after the root word of the verb are replaced by the letters "e/ē" if the statement is politely delivered.

Example 1:
  is a root word that means 'grill'.
  means 'grill it'.
  roughly means 'you, grill it'.
  is the shortened form of the command 'iyəwən mo'.

Example 2:
  is a root word that means 'wipe'.
  means 'wipe it'.
  roughly means 'you, wipe it'.
  is a shortened form of the command .

Example 3:
  is a root word that means 'prepare'.
  means 'prepare it'.
  means 'you, prepare it'.
  is the shortened form of the command .

Pronouns

Lexicon

Sentences 

 What is your name? – 
 My name is Joseph. –  ( is a rinconadised form of Spanish José)
 Where do you come from? – 
 I'm from Pili, Camarines Sur. – 
 I love you so much. – 
 Do you like me? – 
 What are you doing? – 
 I will go home. – 
 John is my brother –  ( is a rinconadised form of Spanish Juan)
 Do you want to eat breakfast? – 
 I'm already eating – 
 What time is it?/May I know what time it is? – 
 I will go out – 
 I can't sleep. – 
 Are you afraid of the dark? – 
 He said he will pick me up/fetch me. – 
 How old are you? – 
 When will you be back? –

Family titles 

  – father
  – mother
  – dad
  – mom
  – older brother
  – older sister
  – uncle
  – aunt

Question words 
 – what

 – who

 – when

 – why

 – where

 – how

 – which

 – how many

 – how much

 – indefinite question, used to describe the degree or extent to which something is covered such as period or age, vastness or immensity, etc.

Greetings 

General greetings: 

  – Good day (from sunrise to sunset)
  – Good evening (from sunset to sunrise)

Specific greetings:

  – Good morning (from 6:00a.m. to 11:00a.m.)
  – Good noon (from 11:00a.m. to 1:00p.m.)
  – Good afternoon (from 1:00p.m. to 6:00p.m.)
  – Good evening (from 6:00p.m. to 11:00p.m.)
  – Good midnight (from 11:00p.m. to 1:00a.m.)
  – Good dawn (from 1:00a.m. to 6:00a.m.)

People of Rinconada classify dim or dark hours as nighttime and light hours as daytime. As such, even with the introduction of modern standard time, they consider the hours of 12 midnight until 6 o'clock in the morning nighttime.

Occasional greetings:

  – Happy birthday!
  – Happy New Year!
  – Happy anniversary!

Uniqueness and distinction 

The vocabulary of Rinconada Bikol is rich in words with short or unstressed . However, not all words with  should be read and pronounced as such since there are several words that have stressed , especially loanwords, e.g. ('chili'). Native words (root words) with stressed  are seldom or rare.

The language retains the proto-Philippine schwa vowel  that has disappeared in most Philippine languages like Cebuano, Tagalog and even the neighboring Coastal Bikol language. In Nabua, Camarines Sur, (where the language is believed to have originated), the vowel also disappeared through normal development and evolution. However, it was preserved by those who moved and migrated to the highland part of Rinconada around Mount Iriga (formerly Mount Asog) due to severe flooding in the lowlands, particularly in Nabua and Bula, thus preserving the vowel which has survived to this day in the Sinabukid dialect.

People who are new to the highland accent may find the Sinabukid dialect sounds like Ilokano, Pangasinense, or Karay-a of Antique province. The vowel can also be heard from the population in towns and cities speaking the Albay Bikol group of languages.

Aside from the vowel , another notable aspect of Rinconada language is the occurrence of the extra consonant phoneme . This consonant bears the sound of mixed letters "h", "y" and "w". The neighboring language of Buhinon also uses this sound - clear evidence of close ties between the two languages.
This phoneme has neither a corresponding letter in the Philippine alphabet nor an equivalent character on the Philippine standard keyboard. Thus, Rinconada Bikol speakers have no option but to use "h" as an alternative letter. However, in the spoken Sinaranəw dialect, the consonant  and the vowel  are often replaced by the letters "w" and "o", respectively.

Examples of 

  – 'will eat breakfast'

  – 'cold cooked rice'

  – process of separating rice from its outside layer after milling;  in Filipino/Tagalog.

  – plant leaf.

  – cover, protect, or conceal. 


The special consonant phoneme  can easily be distinguished from the sound of letters "h", "w" and y" if it is placed before the vowel phoneme . It can be compared to the letter "j" in the Spanish phrase .

The letter  in Rinconada is not the typical pronunciation of the vowel /e/ in other languages - such as the word beg and bell in English, or the word  in Kapampangan meaning 'one' -  in IPA (open- or low-mid front unrounded vowel). The letter  in Rinconada is pronounced similar to the letter sequence  in English, or the letter  of most languages, but the mouth is more open and the tongue is a bit relaxed.
So its pronunciation lies in between that of leed   and led .

Example:  - 'chide, scold'.

Rules for [j] 

Unlike other letters in the Rinconada native alphabet, the letter /j/ is always accompanied by /d/ if it is in the middle of a word. Otherwise, single /j/ is used. Moreover, it is the only non-gliding consonant that cannot be found at the end of a word in native Rinconada vocabulary.

Some words in native Rinconada and Rinconadized words of foreign origin with /j/:

  – 'diamond' (from Spanish )
  – 'again, always'
  – 'newspaper' (from Spanish )
  – 'marble (toy)'
  – 'nuisance' (from Spanish )
  – a large and non-venomous snake
  – no counterpart in English and Filipino (nearest meaning: 'jealous' or 'envious')
  – 'prompted, investigated, an action for questioning'
  – a thorny plant abundant in Bicol region,  in Tagalog (scientific name Amaranthus spinosus)
  – a bicycle converted into a tricycle, powered by human force (a mode of transportation known in Metro Manila as )
  – 'a sliver of wood, metal or bamboo in the skin'
  – a word used to address a disliked person discussed in conversation; it is a word included in Bikol Angry Speech Register
  – 'prayer'

The consonant [h] 

Through language evolution, Rinconada Bikol almost lost the phoneme , hence it is rare. It is often absent in most Rinconada words that are usually present in other Philippine languages.

There is no real  sound in Rinconada. It is either silent or glided and sounds like a long tonal vowel, or vowel lengthening. The letter  is omitted since it is silent; on the other hand, it is glided when in between vowels.

The disappearance of the phoneme  is an occurrence comparable (though not to the same degree) to that in the Kapampangan language. Nevertheless, Rinconada Bikol speakers can pronounce it with clarity and emphasis whenever they speak other languages where it is present.

Vocabulary 

For centuries under Spanish rule, Rinconada adopted many words from Spanish.

Older generations tend to use Spanish loanwords more often while younger generations tend to use Tagalog words and rinconadized words from English, especially modern terminology with no counterpart in native Rinconada Bikol vocabulary.

Example:

. ('Limit your habit of escaping class sessions especially when examination is approaching near').

Angry speech register 

The angry register is unique to Bicol languages as it cannot be found in other Austronesian languages inside and outside the Philippines. It is generally used only among same-age speakers or by older speakers to younger listeners, as usage by younger speakers in addressing their elders would constitute great disrespect. On occasion, the angry register is used in sarcasm or humor, but the majority of its usage is in anger.

Rinconada Bikol has contributed much to this unique feature of spoken Bicolano languages.

Examples:

Sainigin 

Sainigin is a group of selected words for babies and newborns. It is used by parents to communicate with their babies easily and to train them how to talk, hence, an introductory language. It is often described as language for babies and commonly called  or "baby talk". Words are limited to two syllables and feature basic commands. Several letters are absent such as "r", "g", "s", "j", and "h".  literally means 'talking or acting like a baby'.

Phonology

Consonants 

Notes:

Vowels

Diphthong (saəy)
Rinconada Bikol has several diphthongs or gliding vowels.

Diacritics (kul-it) 

Rinconada uses a variation of the Latin alphabet modeled on the Tagalog alphabet. This is to highlight the meaning of the words and to differentiate homonyms. In return, the diacritics provide Rinconada Bikol with a unique orthography among Philippine languages. Diacritics for this language are limited to the macron and circumflex which is unlike other languages, for example Vietnamese which has several. However, due to technical difficulties and a scarcity of resources, diacritics are sometimes not available. Thus, two Rinconada alphabets were created to meet the needs of the speakers: the native and the simplified. Both can be used at the same time depending on the situation, purpose and availability of resources.

Glottal stop (rəgsad) 

This can only be found in the native form of alphabet, and it is limited to final vowels or vowels at the end of a word.  is represented by the circumflex ( ˆ ).

Alphabet

Native 

The Rinconada native alphabet has six short vowels, six long vowels, and seventeen consonants, a total of twenty-nine letters representing all phonemes in Rinconada Bikol. A long or stressed vowel is written with a macron (a diacritic placed above a vowel). It also includes the velar nasal special character  that represents "ng". The native alphabet contains phonemes that are native to Rinconada, thus making it the standard Rinconada Bikol alphabet.

Example of a Filipino proverb written in the Rinconada native alphabet:

 (Tagalog: .)

Notes:
Exceptions to the rules of the native alphabet are formal names like Juan Dela Cruz and placenames such as Laguna, Cebu and Manila. Those names must retain their official and simplified spelling instead of their native spellings Huwan Delā Krus, Lagūna, Sebū and Manīla. With the exception of names and places, all words in the native alphabet must be written with their respective spellings with their designated diacritics.

Simplified 

The Rinconada Simplified alphabet is just the same as the Philippine alphabet. It has 28 letters:

The letters F, V and Z are included because they are native to other Philippine languages like Itawis and Ibanag. The letters C, Ñ, and Q are also included, but their usages are limited to foreign names, Filipinized words of foreign origins or loans, especially from Spanish, English and Arabic.

The simplified alphabet does not use diacritics like the macron  for stressed and long vowels, the circumflex  for glottal stop, or the letters for velar nasal , schwa , or velar fricative , as they do not appear on a standard QWERTY keyboard. Even with the absence of diacritics in the modern and simplified alphabet, pronunciations in the spoken language are not altered. Moreover, the long vowel sound in a word should not be omitted. In this case, the pronunciation of the words depends on their place and usage in a sentence. To avoid confusion and aid in ease of reading, it is strongly recommended to use the native alphabet in writing Rinconada Bikol.

Numerals 

Numbers and words (in the native alphabet) are as follows:

There are no written records to indicate that Rinconada has native words for two-digit numbers (11–99). On the other hand, there is also no proof that the language has no indigenous words for those numbers. It is intriguing that Rinconada has native words for three-digit numbers (e.g.  for 100) but not for two-digit numbers. Utilization and adaptation of foreign terminology during the 333 years of Spanish colonization could be one of the reasons why the native terminology may not have been passed to the new generations. Noting that an established language needs a complete numbering system in words, thus the reconstruction of words for 11 to 99 is necessary but needs to follow and retain the indigenous or original structural form of Rinconada's orthography.

Structure 

The number words for 1 to 10 and 100 are all native Rinconada while numbers 11 to 99 are all reconstructed. However, the reconstructed numbers are based on the original structure. The evolution of the word  from  follows the orthography of Rinconada and developed naturally over the years.
Being said, it is imperative that all reconstructed numbers must follow the same format of the number 10.

The word  is derived from a portmanteau of the words  +  +  which is the based tenth of one. In the evolution of this number, the schwa letter  of  became silent and so the word became . As with other Philippine languages,  became , replacing the last consonant of the first word (which is ), and became the connector to the second word (which is ) – thus,  was omitted and the word became . The word thus became .

  +  +  = 
  –  = 
  –  = 
  replaced by  = 
  replaced by  before  = .

From , all two-digit numbers were given a name that was copied from it. The exception to the naming system of numbers is the number zero (0). Though zero (0) is a single digit, there is no native word for it. As a result, Rinconada has a complete basic set of numbers without using foreign words.

The number referenced in Php 356,817,142,590 can be translated into Rinconada Bikol as:

In English it is:

'Three hundred fifty six billion, eight hundred seventeen million, one-hundred forty two thousand and five hundred ninety pesos'.

In Filipino it is:

Rinconada numbers in words are very simple in structure. Translations are shorter than both Filipino and English languages.

Comparison chart

Intelligibility 

Although properly considered separate languages, speakers of Rinconada Bikol or Rinconada can communicate with Albay Bikol speakers with ease and without code-switching. A student from Ligao City (West Miraya speaker) studying at a university in Iriga City can understand Rinconada (any variant) and can be understood by Rinconada speakers as well. The same thing will happen if a local tourist from Rinconada visits the Cagsawa Ruins in Albay or visits Donsol, Sorsogon (East Miraya speaker) for the annual whale shark sightings. The difference between Rinconada and Albay Bikol (both are included in the Inland Bikol group) is comparable to German and Yiddish or Portuguese and Galician, while the differences between variants are comparable to those between English US, English British and English Australian. The mutual intelligibility of Rinconada and Albay Bikol is 80% to 85%, while intelligibility between variants is 95% to 98%.

Status 
Rinconada Bikol is a minority language in the Bicol region despite having hundreds of thousands of speakers. It is currently not used in commercial media (print, radio, television) despite the fact that there are numerous prominent Rinconada speakers in the music and entertainment industry, media, and Philippine politics. It is not among the recognized regional languages in the Philippines and remains unknown to many Filipinos as it is poorly documented, researched and promoted.

Currently, the major obstacle to the diffusion of the usage and teaching of Rinconada is the lack of written material in Rinconada Bikol language, namely books, newspapers, software, magazines, etc. Thus, Rinconada, along with other Inland Bikol languages and the minor indigenous languages of Bicol region, remains essentially a spoken language.

Due to the everyday exposure of younger generations to Filipino/Tagalog and English in mass media and on social networking sites, native words that are rarely used are now disappearing and being replaced by their counterparts from other languages. If it cannot be stopped by any means, this trend is more likely to continue and might endanger the language in the near future.

Publication 

The only dictionary written for the language is Rinconada: Bikol-Filipino-English Phrasebook: with Mini-dictionary (2001) of Jason Lobel and Grace Bucad of Nabua, Camarines Sur. Several books were successfully written and published by native speakers and non-speakers alike. Some were published by Frank Peñones, Jason Chancoco, Rizaldy Manrique, Jonher Cañeba and Kristian Cordero of Iriga City. In 2004, published by Frank Peñones, was the first anthology written in Rinconada Bikol.

On June 25, 2013, the Camarines Sur Polytechnic Colleges (CSPC), a state college in Nabua, Camarines Sur, established the Center for Rinconada Studies to serve as the research center for the Rinconada Bikol language and heritage.

Distribution 

Rinconada is spoken by the majority in Bula, Baao, Nabua, Balatan, Iriga and Bato in Camarines Sur (politically the fifth district of Camarines Sur province except the municipality of Buhi, where the majority speaks Buhinon). The language is dominant and the lingua franca in the southern half of the provincial capital town of Pili, the west barangays of Ocampo, and the far west barangays of Buhi; it can also be heard in neighboring places such as the northern barangays of Polangui and Libon in Albay.

Figure:

Based on the population of towns and cities with a concentration of Rinconada Bikol speakers, the total number is 479,208 or almost half a million. This number is based on the population of the fifth district of Camarines Sur (Rinconada) and neighboring towns of Polangui and Pili, in which Rinconada Bikol is their de facto daily language. Moreover, the total number does not include speakers outside the Rinconada area. Some linguists place the native speaker population at an estimated 600,000 because there are many speakers outside the region who have left in search of better job opportunities. An example of this are the Filipinos enlisted in the US Navy who are from Nabua, Camarines Sur, comprising 10% of all Filipino US Servicemen. Most of these Rinconada speakers now reside mostly in San Diego, California.

References

External links

Bikol languages
Languages of Camarines Sur
Languages of the Philippines